Natsi (Dargwa: НяхIцIa) is a rural locality (a selo) and the administrative centre of Natsinsky Selsoviet, Akushinsky District, Republic of Dagestan, Russia. The population was 149 as of 2010. There are 5 streets.

Geography 
Natsi is located 35 km south of Akusha (the district's administrative centre) by road. Nakhki is the nearest rural locality.

References 

Rural localities in Akushinsky District